Faryab-e Sanguyeh (also Romanized as Fāryāb-e Sangūyeh; also known as Fāryāb-e Sangū and Fāryāb-e-Sengu) is a village in Fatuyeh Rural District, in the Central District of Bastak County, Hormozgan Province, Iran. At the 2006 census, its population was 609, in 108 families.

References 

Populated places in Bastak County